Alar Sikk (born 4 January 1966 in Võru) is an Estonian alpinist. 

Since 1998 he has practiced alpinism under the guidance of Jaan Künnap. On May 22, 2003, he reached the summit of Mount Everest becoming the first Estonian to reached the highest summit in the world.

Awards
 2003 and 2007: Hiker of the Year
 2004 he was awarded with Order of the Estonian Red Cross, III class.

References

Living people
1966 births
Estonian mountain climbers
People from Võru